The National Sun Yat-sen Memorial Hall is located in Xinyi District, Taipei, Taiwan. It is a memorial to the Republic of China's National Father, Dr. Sun Yat-sen, and was completed in 1972. It contains displays of Sun's life and the revolution he led, and is also a multi-purpose social, educational and cultural center for the public.

Description 

The main entrance to the hall contains a statue of Sun Yat-sen. Every hour, there is a formal changing of the guards, which is a popular tourist attraction.

The building itself is sited in Chung-shan Park. It includes gardens, decorative historical walls, and an exhibition and performance area surrounding Lake Cui, also known as Emerald Pond.

History 
Taiwan's government began to prepare the construction of the National Dr. Sun Yat-sen Memorial Hall in 1964. In 1965, President Chiang Kai-shek officiated the groundbreaking ceremony. The design plan by architect Wang Ta-hung was selected in a public contest one year later, and modified under the instruction of Chiang, to emphasize Chinese architectural characteristics. The main construction was completed on 16 May 1972. Chiang's funeral was held in the main hall of the Sun Yat-sen Memorial Hall in 1975. Originally, the Memorial Hall primarily functioned as a place to display the historical relics of Sun's life and the Xinhai Revolution. It was later opened to exhibitions and performances. Taiwan's highest movie award ceremony, the Golden Horse Film Festival and Awards, is held annually in the Memorial Hall Auditorium.

Initially affiliated with the city government of Taipei, the Memorial Hall became part of the Ministry of Education, together with the Chung-Shan Building in Yangmingshan, in 1986.

Transportation 
Sun Yat-sen Memorial Hall is accessible within walking distance East from Sun Yat-sen Memorial Hall Station of the Taipei Metro (Blue) Bannan Line towards Taipei Nangang Exhibition Centre.

See also 
National Chiang Kai-shek Memorial Hall
Sun Yat-sen Mausoleum
Sun Yat Sen Memorial House
Sun Yat Sen Nanyang Memorial Hall
Chung-Shan Building
Sun Yat Sen Memorial Park

External links 

 

1972 establishments in Taiwan
Buildings and structures completed in 1972
Monuments and memorials in Taiwan
Tourist attractions in Taipei
Sun Yat-sen museums
Museums in Taipei
Biographical museums in Taiwan
Monuments and memorials to Sun Yat-sen